The 1998 D.C. United season was the clubs' fourth year of existence, as well as their third season in Major League Soccer.

D.C. United entered their third season as the two-time defending MLS Cup champion, as well as the defending Supporters' Shield titleholder. Finishing as runners-up in MLS Cup '98 and second-place in the regular season standings, United failed to defend both domestic honors. In international play, D.C. United made American soccer history, becoming the first American soccer club to win any CONCACAF club tournament when they won the 1998 CONCACAF Champions' Cup. It was only the third time in CONCACAF history that an American soccer club reached the Champions' Cup final (previously achieved by Los Angeles Galaxy the previous season and New York Pancyprian-Freedoms in 1984 though they were disqualified without playing in the finals). Besides D.C. United, only the Galaxy have won the Champions' Cup, which they accomplished in 2000.  Following the Galaxy's win, no American club reached the North American club final again until 2011 when Real Salt Lake reached the 2011 CONCACAF Champions League Finals.

Background 

D.C. United ended their sophomore campaign on a high note, claiming the "league double", earning both the Supporters' Shield (regular season), and the 1997 MLS Cup championship (postseason). During the 1997 campaign, the club nearly earned a tuble, which is to win four or more top tier trophies during a single season, but ultimately fell short of that. In the domestic cup competition, the U.S. Open Cup, D.C. United reached the final of the competition, only to lose against Dallas Burn (now known as FC Dallas). In the continental club tournament, the CONCACAF Champions' Cup, United finished in third place, after falling to Los Angeles Galaxy in the semifinals.

Competitions

Major League Soccer

Standings

Eastern Conference

Overall table

Results by round

Match reports

MLS Cup Playoffs

Eastern Conference semifinals

Eastern Conference finals

MLS Cup

CONCACAF Champions' Cup

Copa Interamericana

Statistics

Appearances and goals

Transfers

In

Out

Loan in

Loan out

References 

1998
Dc United
Dc United
1998 in sports in Washington, D.C.
1998